Francis Nenik works as a farmer and writes in his free time. He has published several novels. Current works include XO (a novel in the form of a loose-leaf collection) as well as a collection of short stories with strict alliteration (2013).

His most recent work is The Marvel of Biographical Bookkeeping, a formally innovative book that explores the life stories of Nicholas Moore and Ivan Blatný, two 20th-century poets whose stars burned bright in their youths, Moore in England and Blatný in Czechoslovakia. Later in their lives both men were battered by history and individual fate.
The book's wildly imaginative structures are built on meticulous research, and as the two men's separate, parallel existences unfold, they reveal astounding coincidences and heartbreaking reversals of fortune.

An English translation of his story "Joseph and I" was published in the Spring 2013 issue of Mad Hatters' Review. Words Without Borders called him "a comic genius, a master of dialogue and invention who finds humor in the darkest of places and darkness in the midst of jokes."

In 2014, he started writing a series of political short stories.

In 2016, Fiktion.cc published Neniks novel "Coin-Operated History". Spector Books published a selection of Neniks literary essays, called "Doppelte Biografieführung".

On January 20, 2017, he began his "Diary of a Derelict", which addresses the presidency of Donald Trump.

In 2018 his book "Reise durch ein tragikomisches Jahrhundert" was published. It gained positive reviews and was nominated for the "hotlist" of outstanding books produced by independent publishers in Switzerland, Austria and Germany. The book was translated into English and published under the title "Journey through a Tragicomic Century. The Absurd Life of Hasso Grabner" (2020).

Also in 2021, Nenik's novel "E. or The Island" was published, which deals with the German euthanasia program during the Nazi era. The book was a success and Nenik was awarded the Anna Seghers Prize in November 2021.

Work

Books
 XO, ed[ition]. cetera, Leipzig, 2012. (A novel in the form of a loose-leaf collection). - The book online (Published under a CC license)
 Ach, bald crashen die Entrechteten furchtlos gemeingefährliche, hoheitliche Institutionen, jagen kriegserfahrene Leutnants mit Nachtsichtgeräten oder parlieren querbeet Russisch, Swahili, Türkisch und Vietnamesisch, während Xanthippe Yamswurzeln züchtet, ed[ition]. cetera, Leipzig, 2013. (A book with stories in strict alliteration, illustrated by Halina Kirschner), Sample Free audiobook
 Doppelte Biografieführung, Spector Books, Leipzig, 2016.
 Münzgesteuerte Geschichte, (Novel), Fiktion.cc, Berlin, 2016. online.
 Coin-Operated History, (Novel), transl. Amanda DeMarco, Fiktion.cc, Berlin, 2016. .
 Reise durch ein tragikomisches Jahrhundert. Das irrwitzige Leben des Hasso Grabner. Voland & Quist, Dresden/Leipzig 2018.

Stories/Essays (in German) 
 Sich frei publizieren, Fiktion, April 2016, Berlin. online.
 Hymne auf einen amerikanischen Eiergroßhändler, in: Edit 66, Frühjahr 2015, S. 60-69 and bilingual (English/German) in: Words Without Borders. Translated by Amanda DeMarco, July 2015.
 Unglaubliche wiewohl nicht weniger wahrhafte Geschichten aus einem freien Land. (Political Short Stories)
 Zu Tode gelebt. Die Geschichte des Edward Vincent Swart (Literary Essay), in: Merkur. Deutsche Zeitschrift für Europäisches Denken, Heft April 2014, S. 319–327.
 Geschichten aus der Geschichte der Zukunft der Literatur, in: Neue Rundschau, Heft 1/2014, S. 14–25. 
 Joseph und ich.. (Story. Radio reading)
 Joseph und ich In: Edit 61, Frühjahr 2013, reprinted in: Daniel Tyradellis/Ellen Blumenstein (Ed.): Friendly Fire and Forget, Matthes & Seitz, Berlin 2015.
 Report 23/02/2013. (A story to mark Chelsea Manning's 1000 days in prison.)
 Wie Hunter Mayhem nach Uruguay reiste. (A short story)
 Vom Wunder der doppelten Biografieführung. (Literary Essay) in: Edit 59, Sommer 2012. "Radio reading"
 Theorie der sekundären Primärverwertung.

English Translations
Journey through a Tragicomic Century. The Absurd Life of Hasso Grabner. Translated by Katy Derbyshire, V&Q Books, Berlin 2020, .
Seven Palms. The Thomas Mann House in Pacific Palisades, Los Angeles. Translated by Jan Caspers, Spector Boooks, Leipzig, 2021 .
The Scarred Tissue of a Ship's Hull. Translated by Katy Derbyshire, in: Brixton Review of Books 12/2020, p. 16–18.
Diary of a Derelict. Translated by Paul Noske, Leipzig 2017.
 The Marvel of Biographical Bookkeeping. Translated by Katy Derbyshire. Readux Books, 2013, Sample
 How Hunter Mayhem traveled to Uruguay. Translated by Bradley Schmidt. No Man's Land # 8, Winter 2013.
 Joseph and I. Translated by Bradley Schmidt. Mad Hatters' Review, 2013.
 In Praise of an American Egg Wholesaler. Translated by Amanda DeMarco, Words Without Borders, July 2015.
 Coin-operated History (Novel), Translated by Amanda DeMarco, Fiktion, Berlin, 2016. online.
  Publish and be Free (Essay on publishing with an open license and Creative Commons), Fiktion, Berlin, April 2016. online.
 Burning bright, Burning out. The Story of Poet and Anti-Apartheid Activist Edward Vincent Swart. Translated by Anna Aitken, in: Transition-Magazine 119 (April 2016), S. 155–167.

References

21st-century German novelists
German farmers
Living people
German male novelists
21st-century German male writers
Year of birth missing (living people)